Jim Beattie (born 16 February 1973 in Glasgow) is a Scottish former professional footballer, who played for St Mirren, Ayr United and Albion Rovers in the Scottish Football League. He also played abroad in Finland for Premier League club MyPa.

References

External links

1973 births
Living people
Footballers from Glasgow
Scottish footballers
Scottish expatriate footballers
Celtic F.C. players
St Mirren F.C. players
Ayr United F.C. players
Albion Rovers F.C. players
Petershill F.C. players
Myllykosken Pallo −47 players
Scottish Football League players
Association football fullbacks
Scotland under-21 international footballers
Expatriate footballers in Finland
Scottish expatriate sportspeople in Finland